Giorgi Revazishvili (born 16 November 1974) is a Georgian judoka. He was arrested and convicted on the charges of extortion of USD 8,000 from Greek businessman in Tbilisi.

After the court passed decision to imprison the perpetrators their friends, mainly wrestlers and relatives, destroyed the court hall and blocked the central Rustaveli Avenue inTbilisi. Riot police was deployed to the streets first time since the "Rose revolution" and police dispersed the demonstration. The arrests of the wrestlers resulted in protests by other sportsmen. Some of them even refused to take part in preparatory training for the World Championship in wrestling. Nestor Khergiani, two time champion of Europe in judo, stated: “We are not going to wrestle! Let the government officials wrestle instead of us”.

Later on, Zviad Zviadauri, Olympic champion in Judo and Dilar Khabuliani, former Minister of Interior and president of Judo Federation, apologized to the President Saakashvili for the riots.

Achievements

References

External links
 

1974 births
Living people
Male judoka from Georgia (country)
Judoka at the 1996 Summer Olympics
Judoka at the 2000 Summer Olympics
Olympic judoka of Georgia (country)